Annette Bryn Parri is a Welsh pianist, best known as an accompanist to opera stars such as Bryn Terfel, Rebecca Evans and Jason Howard. Parri appears regularly on the National Eisteddfod stage, and also at the International Eisteddfod at Llangollen.

Early life
Parri was born in Deiniolen, Wales.  Having studied piano with Rhiannon Gabrielson, Parri graduated with a GRNCM in 1984 from the Royal Northern College of Music in Manchester after studying under Marjorie Clementi. Whilst at Manchester, she specialized in lieder, oratorio and opera, but her particular interest was in the Romantic composers.  In 1982, she won the Grace Williams Medal for composition at the Urdd Gobaith Cymru Eisteddfod at Pwllheli.

Career
After leaving the Royal Northern College of Music, Parri joined the staff of the Music Department of Bangor University as a piano tutor.

Parri became an official accompanist at the age of fifteen and made her first appearance in 1983, at the National Eisteddfod in Llangefni. She won the Blue Riband for instrumentalists at the Rhyl National Eisteddfod in 1985. Parri has accompanied at the Albert Hall, London on several occasions and has also performed in private for Sir Andrew Lloyd Webber, Sir George Solti, Prince Charles and Princess Diana. She can be heard accompanying artists such as Bryn Terfel, Aled Jones, Eirian James, Gwyn Hughes-Jones, Leah Marian Jones and Rebecca Evans, and she has appeared on several S4C series, including Noson Lawen, Cân i Gymru and giving a Masterclass on Meistroli.

Since 1993 Parri has accompanied the choirs of  Ysgol Glanaethwy performing arts school in Bangor. From 2002 to 2011 she was Musical Director of the Traeth Male Voice Choir. In 2013 she established TRIO, a male vocal trio.

Parri made her debut at the Edinburgh Festival Fringe in 2005.

Selected discography
 Caneuon Meirion Williams – The Songs Of Meirion Williams (Sain, 1993)
 Un Mondo A Parte (Sain, 2006)
 Annette (Sain, 2010)

References

External links
 Biography of Annette Bryn Parri

Welsh classical pianists
Welsh women pianists
Year of birth missing (living people)
Living people
People from Gwynedd
Alumni of the Royal Northern College of Music
Academics of the University of Wales
21st-century classical pianists
Women classical pianists
21st-century women pianists